Han Gwang-hyeong (한 광형; also transliterate Han Kwang-hyung; born 18 May 1966) is a South Korean boxer. He competed in the men's flyweight event at the 1992 Summer Olympics.

References

External links
 

1966 births
Living people
South Korean male boxers
Olympic boxers of South Korea
Boxers at the 1992 Summer Olympics
Place of birth missing (living people)
Flyweight boxers